La Celestina is a 1996 Spanish drama directed by Gerardo Vera and written by Rafael Azcona, Gerardo Vera and Francisco Rico based on 1499 novel of the same title by Fernando de Rojas. Starring Penélope Cruz, Terele Pávez and Juan Diego Botto.

Cast

References

External links
 
 

1996 films
1996 drama films
1990s Spanish-language films
Films directed by Gerardo Vera
Spanish drama films
Films shot in the province of Guadalajara
1990s Spanish films